Sears and Dwight won the doubles title by beating Taylor and Brinley in four sets in the final. The final was played on August 26, 1886.

Draw

Notes

References 

Men's Doubles
U.S. National Championships (tennis) by year – Men's doubles